Zygmunt Pawlas (28 October 1930 – 20 June 2001) was a Polish fencer. He won a silver medal in the team sabre event at the 1956 Summer Olympics.

References

1930 births
2001 deaths
Polish male fencers
Olympic fencers of Poland
Fencers at the 1952 Summer Olympics
Fencers at the 1956 Summer Olympics
Olympic silver medalists for Poland
People from Cieszyn Silesia
Olympic medalists in fencing
People from Bielsko County
Medalists at the 1956 Summer Olympics
Sportspeople from Silesian Voivodeship
20th-century Polish people
21st-century Polish people